Joseph Peter McIlvaine (born 1949 in Narberth, Pennsylvania) is a baseball executive and former professional baseball player. 

McIlvaine played in the Detroit Tigers minor league system for 5 seasons. (1969–1973) He posted a win–loss record of 16–16 and an ERA of 3.84. During the 1970s, he was a scout in the Baltimore Orioles, California Angels and Milwaukee Brewers organizations. He became the New York Mets scouting director in 1981 and held that position until 1985. He served as the Mets assistant general manager from 1986 to 1990 until he became the general manager of the San Diego Padres in 1991. He stayed in that position until 1993. In August 1993, he was hired to replace Al Harazin as the Mets general manager, and he served as the Mets' general manager until July 1997. He was a special assistant to the Minnesota Twins general manager from 1998-2012.  He was a Special Assistant to the General Manager of the Seattle Mariners. McIlvaine has returned to the Orioles as senior advisor, player personnel, the team announced Friday, February 12, 2016. He will advise the executive team at the Major League level and on scouting, with a strong focus on the major league baseball draft.

See also

Baseball America
New-York Historical Society

1949 births
Living people
Baltimore Orioles scouts
Batavia Trojans players
Bristol Tigers players
California Angels scouts
Clinton Pilots players
Lakeland Tigers players
Major League Baseball general managers
Milwaukee Brewers scouts
Minnesota Twins scouts
New York Mets executives
San Diego Padres executives
Seattle Mariners scouts
People from Narberth, Pennsylvania